Ermanno Stradelli (born 1852) was an Italian explorer, researcher and photographer. 
He was the first person to photograph the Indians in the Amazon, arriving in Brazil in 1879. His journey has been captured in the book 'The Only Possible Life: Itineraries of Ermanno Stradelli in Amazonia' by Livia Raponi.

Exhibitions 
Ermanno Stradelli - pioneering photographer in the Amazon rainforest at Cultural Institute in Rio de Janeiro , 2019

References 

Italian explorers
1852 births
Year of death missing